The Einstein Prize for Laser Science was a recognition awarded by the former Society for Optical and Quantum Electronics and sponsored by the Eastman Kodak Company.  The prize, awarded in the 1988–1999 period, consisted of a 3-inch brass medal including Einstein's image and a depiction of a two-level transition including the A and B coefficients.  Recipients of the prize include:

 Serge Haroche, 1988 
 Herbert Walther, 1988  
 H. Jeff Kimble, 1989
 Richart E. Slusher, 1989
 Carlton M. Caves, 1990
 Daniel Frank Walls, 1990
 S. E. Harris, 1991 
 L. M. Narducci, 1991
 John L. Hall, 1992 
 Willis E. Lamb, 1992
 Raymond Chiao, 1993 
 Norman F. Ramsey, 1993
 G. S. Agarwal, 1994
 Theodor W. Hänsch, 1995 
 Carl E. Wieman, 1995
 David J. Wineland, 1996
 Peter L. Knight, 1996
 Paul Corkum, 1999

In retrospect, the prize was mainly awarded for significant contributions in quantum optics.  Two recipients of the Einstein Prize for Laser Science were already Nobel laureates in physics (W. E. Lamb and N. F. Ramsey) and five other recipients went on to win the Nobel Prize in Physics (S. Haroche, J. L. Hall, T. W. Hänsch, C. E. Wieman, and D. J. Wineland).  Presentation of the prize was done at the Lasers'88 to Lasers'99 conferences. 

Note: the official name of these conferences was The International Conference on Lasers and Applications, Lasers 'XX.

See also

 List of physics awards

References

External links: group photographs
Group photograph at Lasers'92 including, right to left, Marlan Scully, Willis Lamb, John L. Hall, and F. J. Duarte.
Group photograph at Lasers'93 including (right to left) Norman F. Ramsey, Marlan Scully, and F. J. Duarte.
 Group photograph at Lasers'95 including (right to left) Marlan Scully, Theodor W. Hänsch, Carl E. Wieman, and F. J. Duarte.

Laser awards and associations
Physics awards
Albert Einstein